Noosa Heads is a coastal town and suburb in the Shire of Noosa, Queensland, Australia. It is a popular holiday destination.

Geography
The suburb is bounded to the west by Weyba Creek and the Noosa River and to the north and east by the Coral Sea. The northeast of the locality is within the Noosa National Park. Noosa Heads, Noosaville and Tewantin form a continuous urban area at the northern end of the Sunshine Coast.

There is also Laguna Lookout on a low hill near the town.

Coastal features 
There are a number of headlands, lookouts, bays, and other coastal features along the Noosa Heads coastline, many of them on the coastal walking track through the national park, including (from north to south):

 Noosa Inlet, the mouth of the Noosa River
 Laguna Bay
 Noosa Beach
 Boiling Pot Lookout
 Tea Tree Bay
 Dolphin Point, a headland
 Dolphin Point Lookout
 Granite Bay

 Fairy Pools, a rockhole

 Noosa Head (also known as Low Bluff), a headland
 Hell's Gates Lookout
 Hells Gates
 Alexandria Bay
 Alexandria Beach
 Roaring Cave (also known as the Blowhole)
 Harrys Lookout
 Devils Kitchen
 Paradise Caves

History

Gubbi Gubbi (Kabi Kabi, Cabbee, Carbi, Gabi Gabi) is an Australian Aboriginal language spoken on Gubbi Gubbi country. The Gubbi Gubbi language region includes the landscape within the local government boundaries of the Sunshine Coast Region and Gympie Region, particularly the towns of Caloundra, Noosa Heads, Gympie and extending north towards Maryborough and south to Caboolture.

It is widely stated that name Noosa is a corruption of the Kabi word nuthuru, meaning a ghost or a shadow. However this is unlikely as a 1870 map of Noosa shows the Noosa River written as Nusa River  and a notice to mariners published in the 3rd September 1873 refers to Nusa Head and the Nusa River in Laguna Bay.   Nusa is the Indonesian word for island. The Noosa River contains  Makepeace Island, Sheep Island and Goat Island. "Nusa Bay, or as it is better known, Lagoona Bay" appears in a 1866 article
 and the locality of Nusa appears in a 1869 article.  Laguna Bay was formally known as Nusa Bay and Lagoona Bay. 

The beach at Noosa Heads has remained a popular tourist attraction since the 1890s. The Shire's tourism exponentially grew shortly after the Second World War.

In the 1800s, Noosa's early wealth came from the timber and milling industries with tourism developing in the late 1920s. In this decade cafes and tourist accommodation was built along the beachfront. The town has been the site of many tussles between developers and those seeking to preserve the town.

A fatal shark attack of a 22-year-old surfer was recorded at Noosa in 1961.

Since the seventies, people have continued to migrate from southern states.

In 1988, Noosa was renamed Noosa Heads.

In 2009 as part of the Q150 celebrations, Noosa was announced as one of the Q150 Icons of Queensland for its role as a "location".

The local print newspaper was the Noosa News. Along with many other regional Australian newspapers owned by NewsCorp, the newspaper ceased print editions in June 2020 and became an online-only publication from 26 June 2020.

In May 2021, Noosa was named as the top tourism town in Queensland.

Heritage listings
Noosa Heads has a number of heritage-listed sites, including:
 17 Noosa Drive: Halse Lodge

Education 
There are no schools in Noosa Heads. The nearest government primary and secondary schools are Sunshine Beach State School and Sunshine Beach State High School in neighbouring Sunshine Beach to the east.

Amenities 
The Noosa Shire Council operates a mobile library service which visits Lanyana Way at Noosa Junction.

There are two jetties, managed by the Noosa Shire Council:

 Woods Bay jetty at Claude Batten Drive

 Ravenwood Drive jetty at Ravenwood Park

Attractions

Noosa Heads hosts a population of koalas, which are often seen in and around Noosa National Park. The koala population in Noosa is in decline. Native black and grey-headed flying foxes (tree pollinators and seed dispersal agents) can be heard in local trees if they are flowering or fruiting. Micro-bat species are also common and aid in insect control.

Noosa Lions Park is an open, grassed area which used as a staging area for several large community events including the Noosa Triathlon, Noosa Food and Wine Festival, Noosa Winter Festival and Noosa Classic Car Show.

To overcome severe beach erosion at Noosa's main beach a sand pumping system has been built.  It operates when necessary during off peak hours, supplying sand via a pipeline built underneath the boardwalk.

Noosa Heads' main attraction is its beaches. Its main beach and its small bays around the headland are common surfing locations which are known on world surfing circuits. One of its major surfing contests involves the Noosa Festival of Surfing. This festival attracts large numbers of longboarders.

Media 
The local newspaper is the Noosa News, an online-only publication of NewsCorp.

Transport 
Noosa Heads is the tourist heart of Noosa district, with many restaurants and hotels. The main street is Hastings Street, which lies directly behind the seashore. Buses to elsewhere in the Sunshine Coast depart from Noosa Heads bus station.

There are dedicated bike lanes throughout the shire. Push bikes are an easy way to get around. Bike racks are provided in all shopping and beach precincts.

Motor scooter is another option. There are scooter parking bays on Hastings Street, Noosa Heads, and on many shopping strips.

There is a taxi rank in Hastings Street and at Noosa Fair shopping centre.

Notable residents 
Bob Ansett  - entrepreneur, actor and writer

See also

References

External links

 
 Official Tourism Noosa Website

Suburbs of Noosa Shire, Queensland
Coastal towns in Queensland
Headlands of Queensland
Surfing locations in Queensland
Beaches of Queensland